The 2018–19 Oklahoma City Thunder season was the 11th season of the franchise in Oklahoma City and the 53rd in the National Basketball Association (NBA). Nick Collison (who had been with the franchise since it was based in Seattle), retired in May 2018 and was not on the roster for the first time since the 2002–03 season. The only remaining former SuperSonics' active players are Jeff Green and Kevin Durant, both of whom played their rookie seasons with the team in Seattle. Collison's retirement also left Russell Westbrook as the longest tenured Thunder player and last remaining player on the roster from the 2011–12 season in which they won the Western Conference and went to the NBA Finals. On March 20, 2019, the Thunder retired Collison's No. 4 jersey, becoming the first Thunder player and the last former Sonic player to have their jersey retired. The Thunder had the fourth best team defensive rating in the NBA.

Despite speculation that Paul George would sign with his hometown team, the Los Angeles Lakers, in the off-season, George instead re-signed with the Thunder on June 30, 2018, exactly a year after he was traded to the team from the Indiana Pacers. The Thunder then clinched another playoff season due to the Kings loss to the Rockets on March 30.

In the playoffs, the Thunder were eliminated by the Portland Trail Blazers in the First Round thanks to a Damian Lillard series-clinching three pointer over Paul George in Game 5. This marked the third consecutive season the Thunder was eliminated in the First Round, and they are 0–9 in road playoff games since Durant's departure from the team. After 11 years, this season also marked the end of an era as Russell Westbrook was traded to the Houston Rockets following this season, and reunited him with former Thunder teammate James Harden, whom had played for the team from the 2009 to 2012 seasons.

Previous season
The Thunder finished the 2017–18 season 48–34 to finish in second place in the Northwest Division, fourth in the Western Conference and qualified for the playoffs. Last season featured the acquisitions of Paul George and Carmelo Anthony to a form a "Big Three" with reigning MVP Russell Westbrook. The Thunder however fell in the first round to the Utah Jazz in six games.

Offseason

Draft picks

The Thunder had two second-round picks entering the draft. The Thunder traded their 2018 first-round pick in the Enes Kanter trade to the Utah Jazz back in 2015 which was later traded by the Jazz to the Minnesota Timberwolves. The Thunder's other second-round pick was originally acquired from the Boston Celtics as a result of the Perry Jones trade in 2015.

On draft night, the Thunder traded a 2019 second-round pick and cash considerations to the Charlotte Hornets in exchange for the draft rights to Hamidou Diallo, the forty-fifth pick. The trade was later finalized on July 6.

The Thunder, after the 2018 NBA Draft night and the conclusion of player acquisitions and transactions, ended with Kentucky guard Hamidou Diallo, Virginia guard Devon Hall and Texas-Arlington forward Kevin Hervey.

Trades
On July 20, the Thunder traded Dakari Johnson and cash considerations to the Orlando Magic in exchange for Rodney Purvis in an effort for payroll relief. By trading Johnson's guaranteed contract for Purvis's non-guaranteed contract, the Thunder saved nearly $6.6 million in luxury tax savings. On July 23, the Thunder then traded Rodney Purvis to the Boston Celtics in exchange for Abdel Nader and cash considerations.

On July 25, the Thunder traded Carmelo Anthony and a 2022 protected first-round pick to the Atlanta Hawks in a three team trade, for Dennis Schröder from Atlanta and Timothé Luwawu-Cabarrot from Philadelphia. Coming off his lowest scoring season, Anthony saw his role and playing time dwindle during the season and playoffs. After the season ended, Anthony rejected the idea of coming off the bench is "out of the question" while preferring to play with the ball in his hands more. Following the Thunder's defeat against the Utah Jazz, Anthony was the focal point of trade talks in order to save on the luxury tax bill for next season. 

In exchange for Anthony, the Thunder received Dennis Schröder and Timothé Luwawu-Cabarrot. Schröder came off the 2017-18 season as the leading scorer for the Hawks, averaging 19.4 points. The past two seasons, Schröder had developed into a starter leading the Hawks to a playoff appearance in 2017. Luwawu-Cabarrot came to the Thunder after two seasons with the 76ers since being selected 24th overall in the 2016 NBA Draft.

Free agency

For this offseason, free agency began on July 1st, 2018 while the July moratorium ended on July 6. Corey Brewer, Nick Collison, Raymond Felton, P.J. Dozier, Paul George, Jerami Grant, Daniel Hamilton and Josh Huestis were set to hit unrestricted free agency. On May 10, Nick Collison announced his retirement after 15 years with the Thunder dating back to the Seattle SuperSonics. Collison appeared in 910 games and 91 playoff games with career averages of 5.9 points, 5.2 rebounds and 1.0 assists. 
 On June 30, it was reported that Paul George agreed to a four-year, $137 million deal to stay with the Thunder, which he later signed on July 6. After informing the Indiana Pacers that he would not re-sign with them, opting to join the Los Angeles Lakers in free agency, the Thunder spent the year recruiting George to sign long-term after trading for him. Since the 2017-18 season ended, the Thunder convinced George to stay, hinging his trust on Sam Presti and his strong relationship with Russell Westbrook.

The same night on June 30, it was reported that Jerami Grant agreed to a three-year, $27 million deal to stay with the Thunder, which he later signed on July 7. On July 3, it was reported that Raymond Felton agreed to a new contract to stay with the Thunder, which he later signed on July 12. Brewer, Dozier, Hamilton and Huestis, who were not re-signed, joined the Philadelphia 76ers, Boston Celtics, Atlanta Hawks and the Austin Spurs of the NBA G League respectively.

On July 2, it was reported that Nerlens Noel agreed to a two-year, minimum deal with the Thunder, which he later signed on July 6. Noel spent the 2017-18 season with the Dallas Mavericks. On July 7, Deonte Burton signed a two-way contract with the Thunder. Burton spent the 2017-18 season with the Wonju DB Promy in the Korean Basketball League before playing for the Thunder in the 2018 NBA Summer League. To fill in the other slot, Tyler Davis signed a two-way contract with the Thunder on August 13. Davis came undrafted out of Texas A&M.

On August 31, Kyle Singler was waived by the Thunder with the stretch provision. By waiving Singler, the Thunder saved more than $20 million in luxury taxes.

Front office and coaching changes
On August 20, the Thunder announced Bob Beyer as an assistant coach. Beyer joins the Thunder after serving as an assistant coach with the Detroit Pistons with most recently being the associate head coach for the last two seasons.

Roster

Salaries

All 2018-19 salaries.
‡ Waived with guaranteed money

Standings

Conference

Division

Game log

Preseason

|- style="background:#fcc;"
| 1
| October 3
| Detroit
| 
| Dennis Schroder (21)
| Steven Adams (12)
| Dennis Schroder (9)
| Chesapeake Energy Arena18,203
| 0–1
|- style="background:#cfc;"
| 2
| October 5
| @ Minnesota
| 
| Paul George (23)
| Steven Adams (13)
| Dennis Schroder (6)
| Target Center 9,807
| 1–1
|- style="background:#cfc;"
| 3
| October 7
| Atlanta
| 
| Paul George (22)
| Steven Adams (9)
| Dennis Schroder (6)
| BOK Center  14,470
| 2–1
|- style="background:#cfc;"
| 4
| October 9
| Milwaukee
| 
| Paul George (26)
| Nerlens Noel (14)
| Abdul Gaddy (5)
| Chesapeake Energy Arena  18,203
| 3–1

Regular season

|- style="background:#fcc;"
| 1
| October 16
| @ Golden State
| 
| Paul George (27)
| Steven Adams (11)
| Dennis Schroder (6)
| Oracle Arena  19,596
| 0–1
|- style="background:#fcc;"
| 2
| October 19
| @ LA Clippers
| 
| Paul George (20)
| Steven Adams (18)
| Dennis Schroder (8)
| Staples Center14,816
| 0–2
|- style="background:#fcc;"
| 3
| October 21
| Sacramento
| 
| Russell Westbrook (32)
| Steven Adams (14)
| Russell Westbrook (8)
| Chesapeake Energy Arena 18,203
| 0–3
|- style="background:#fcc;"
| 4
| October 25
| Boston
| 
| Paul George (22)
| Russell Westbrook (15)
| Russell Westbrook (8)
| Chesapeake Energy Arena  18,203
| 0–4
|- style="background:#cfc;"
| 5
| October 28
| Phoenix
| 
| Russell Westbrook (23)
| Nerlens Noel (15)
| Russell Westbrook (7)
| Chesapeake Energy Arena 18,203
|1–4
|- style="background:#cfc;"
| 6
| October 30
| LA Clippers
| 
| George & Westbrook (32)
| Paul George (12)
| Russell Westbrook (9)
| Chesapeake Energy Arena  18,203
| 2–4

|- style="background:#cfc;"
| 7
| November 1
| @ Charlotte
| 
| Russell Westbrook (29)
| Steven Adams (12)
| Russell Westbrook (10)
| Spectrum Center14,583
| 3–4
|- style="background:#cfc;"
| 8
| November 2
| @ Washington
| 
| Russell Westbrook (23)
| Nerlens Noel (7)
| Russell Westbrook (12)
| Capital One Arena20,409
| 4–4
|- style="background:#cfc;"
| 9
| November 5
| New Orleans
| 
| Paul George (23)
| Steven Adams (8)
| Russell Westbrook (9)
| Chesapeake Energy Arena18,203
| 5–4
|- style="background:#cfc;"
| 10
| November 7
| @ Cleveland
| 
| Dennis Schroder (28)
| Steven Adams (13)
| George & Adams & Ferguson & Felton (2)
| Quicken Loans Arena  19,432
| 6–4
|- style="background:#cfc;"
| 11
| November 8
| Houston
| 
| Paul George (20)
| Paul George(11)
| Paul George (6)
| Chesapeake Energy Arena  18,203
| 7–4
|- style="background:#fcc;"
| 12
| November 10
| @ Dallas
| 
| George & Adams (20)
| George & Adams (13)
| Paul George (6)
| American Airlines Center  19,818
| 7–5
|- style="background:#cfc;"
| 13
| November 12
| Phoenix
| 
| Paul George (32)
| Paul George (8)
| Dennis Schroder (9)
| Chesapeake Energy Arena  18,203
| 8–5
|- style="background:#cfc;"
| 14
| November 14
| New York
| 
| Paul George (35)
| Paul George (7)
| Dennis Schroder (12)
| Chesapeake Energy Arena  18,203
| 9–5
|- style="background:#cfc;"
| 15
| November 17
| @ Phoenix
| 
| Paul George (32)
| Paul George (11)
| Dennis Schroder (7)
| Talking Stick Resort Arena  16,376
| 10–5
|- style="background:#fcc;"
| 16
| November 19
| @ Sacramento
| 
| Russell Westbrook (29)
| Steven Adams (15)
| Russell Westbrook (7)
| Golden 1 Center 16,250
| 10–6
|- style="background:#cfc;"
| 17
| November 21
| @ Golden State
| 
| Dennis Schroder (32)
| Adams, Grant, Westbrook (11)
| Russell Westbrook (13)
| Oracle Arena  19,596
| 11–6
|- style="background:#cfc;"
| 18
| November 23
| Charlotte
| 
| Russell Westbrook (30)
| Russell Westbrook (12)
| Russell Westbrook (8)
| Chesapeake Energy Arena  18,203
| 12–6
|- style="background:#fcc;"
| 19
| November 24
| Denver
| 
| Paul George (24)
| Steven Adams (14)
| Russell Westbrook (12)
| Chesapeake Energy Arena18,203
| 12–7
|- style="background:#cfc;"
| 20
| November 28
| Cleveland
| 
| Russell Westbrook (23)
| Russell Westbrook (18)
| Russell Westbrook (15)
| Chesapeake Energy Arena  18,203
| 13–7
|- style="background:#cfc;"
| 21
| November 30
| Atlanta
| 
| Russell Westbrook (23)
| Steven Adams (13)
| Russell Westbrook (10)
| Chesapeake Energy Arena 18,203
| 14–7

|- style="background:#cfc;"
| 22
| December 3
| @ Detroit
| 
| Steven Adams (21)
| Paul George (10)
| Schroder, Westbrook (6)
| Little Caesars Arena14,372
| 15–7
|- style="background:#cfc;"
| 23
| December 5
| @ Brooklyn
| 
| Paul George (47)
| George & Westbrook (15)
| Russell Westbrook (17)
| Barclays Center13,161
| 16–7
|- style="background:#fcc;"
| 24
| December 7
| @ Chicago
| 
| Russell Westbrook (24)
| Russell Westbrook (17)
| Russell Westbrook (13)
| United Center19,842
| 16–8
|- style="background:#cfc;"
| 25
| December 10
| Utah
| 
| Paul George (31)
| Russell Westbrook (11)
| Russell Westbrook (10)
| Chesapeake Energy Arena18,203
| 17–8
|- style="background:#fcc;"
| 26
| December 12
| @ New Orleans
| 
| Paul George (25)
| Paul George (11)
| Russell Westbrook (7)
| Smoothie King Center 14,450
| 17–9
|- style="background:#fcc;"
| 27
| December 14
| @ Denver
| 
| Paul George (32)
| Russell Westbrook (14)
| Russell Westbrook (8)
| Pepsi Center19,520
| 17–10
|- style="background:#cfc;"
| 28
| December 15
| LA Clippers
| 
| Paul George (33)
| Russell Westbrook (9)
| Russell Westbrook (12)
| Chesapeake Energy Arena18,203
| 18–10
|- style="background:#cfc;"
| 29
| December 17
| Chicago
| 
| Paul George (24)
| Russell Westbrook (16)
| Russell Westbrook (11)
| Chesapeake Energy Arena18,203
| 19–10
|- style="background:#cfc;"
| 30
| December 19
| @ Sacramento
| 
| Paul George (43)
| Steven Adams (23)
| Russell Westbrook (17)
| Golden 1 Center17,583
| 20–10
|- style="background:#cfc;"
| 31
| December 22
| @ Utah
| 
| Paul George (43)
| Paul George (14)
| Russell Westbrook (9)
| Vivint Smart Home Arena  19,111
| 21–10
|- style="background:#fcc;"
| 32
| December 23
| Minnesota
| 
| Paul George (31)
| Paul George (11)
| Russell Westbrook (10)
| Chesapeake Energy Arena  18,203
| 21–11
|- style="background:#fcc;"
| 33
| December 25
| @ Houston
| 
| Paul George (28)
| Paul George (14)
| Russell Westbrook (9)
| Toyota Center  18,055
| 21–12
|- style="background:#cfc;"
| 34
| December 28
| @ Phoenix
| 
| Russell Westbrook (40)
| Steven Adams (13)
| Russell Westbrook (8)
| Talking Stick Resort Arena18,055
| 22–12
|- style="background:#fcc;"
| 35
| December 30
| @ Dallas
| 
| Paul George (36)
| Westbrook, Adams (9)
| Russell Westbrook (8)
| American Airlines Center20,380
| 22–13
|- style="background:#cfc;"
| 36
| December 31
| Dallas
| 
| Russell Westbrook (32)
| Steven Adams (13)
| Russell Westbrook (11)
| Chesapeake Energy Arena 18,203
| 23–13

|- style="background:#cfc;"
| 37
| January 2
| @ LA Lakers
| 
| Paul George (37)
| Russell Westbrook (16)
| Russell Westbrook (10)
| Staples Center18,997
| 24–13
|- style="background:#cfc;"
| 38
| January 4
| @ Portland
| 
| Paul George (37)
| Steven Adams (12)
| Russell Westbrook (7)
| Moda Center19,393
| 25–13
|- style="background:#fcc;"
| 39
| January 6
| Washington
| 
| Russell Westbrook (22)
| Russell Westbrook (15)
| Russell Westbrook (13)
| Chesapeake Energy Arena18,203
| 25–14
|- style="background:#fcc;"
| 40
| January 8
| Minnesota
| 
| Paul George (27)
| Steven Adams (12)
| Russell Westbrook (16)
| Chesapeake Energy Arena18,203
| 25–15
|- style="background:#fcc;"
| 41
| January 10
| @ San Antonio
| 
| Paul George (30)
| Russell Westbrook (13)
| Russell Westbrook (24)
| AT&T Center18,354
| 25–16
|- style="background:#cfc;"
| 42
| January 12
| San Antonio
| 
| Russell Westbrook (24)
| Paul George (11)
| Russell Westbrook (7)
| Chesapeake Energy Arena18,203
| 26–16
|- style="background:#fcc;"
| 43
| January 15
| @ Atlanta
| 
| Russell Westbrook (31)
| Paul George (11)
| Russell Westbrook (8)
| State Farm Arena15,045
| 26–17
|- style="background:#fcc;"
| 44
| January 17
| LA Lakers
| 
| Paul George (27)
| Steven Adams (15)
| Russell Westbrook (13)
| Chesapeake Energy Arena18,203
| 26–18
|- style="background:#cfc;"
| 45
| January 19
| @ Philadelphia
| 
| Paul George (31)
| Russell Westbrook (10)
| Russell Westbrook (6)
| Wells Fargo Center20,646
| 27–18
|- style="background:#cfc;"
| 46
| January 21
| @ New York
| 
| Paul George (31)
| Russell Westbrook (10)
| Russell Westbrook (9)
| Madison Square Garden19,493
| 28–18
|- style="background:#cfc;"
| 47
| January 22
| Portland
| 
| Russell Westbrook (29)
| Russell Westbrook (10)
| Russell Westbrook (14)
| Chesapeake Energy Arena18,203
| 29–18
|- style="background:#cfc;"
| 48
| January 24
| New Orleans
| 
| Russell Westbrook (23)
| Russell Westbrook (17)
| Russell Westbrook (16)
| Chesapeake Energy Arena18,203
| 30–18
|- style="background:#cfc;"
| 49
| January 27
| Milwaukee
| 
| Paul George (36)
| Russell Westbrook, George (13)
| Russell Westbrook (11)
| Chesapeake Energy Arena18,203
| 31–18
|- style="background:#cfc;"
| 50
| January 29
| @ Orlando
| 
| Paul George (37)
| Russell Westbrook (14)
| Russell Westbrook (14)
| Amway Center16,341
| 32–18

|- style="background:#cfc;"
| 51
| February 1
| @ Miami
| 
| Paul George (43)
| Russell Westbrook (12)
| Russell Westbrook (14)
| American Airlines Arena19,600
| 33–18
|- style="background:#fcc;"
| 52
| February 3
| @ Boston
| 
| Paul George (37)
| Russell Westbrook (12)
| Russell Westbrook (16)
| TD Garden18,624
| 33–19
|- style="background:#cfc;"
| 53
| February 5
| Orlando
| 
| Paul George (39)
| Russell Westbrook (15)
| Russell Westbrook (16)
| Chesapeake Energy Arena18,203
| 34–19
|- style="background:#cfc;"
| 54
| February 7
| Memphis
| 
| Paul George (27)
| Russell Westbrook (13)
| Russell Westbrook (15)
| Chesapeake Energy Arena18,203
| 35–19
|- style="background:#cfc;"
| 55
| February 9
| @ Houston
| 
| Paul George (45)
| Russell Westbrook (12)
| Russell Westbrook (11)
| Toyota Center18,061
| 36–19
|- style="background:#cfc;"
| 56
| February 11
| Portland
| 
| Paul George (47)
| Russell Westbrook (14)
| Russell Westbrook (11)
| Chesapeake Energy Arena18,203
| 37–19
|- style="background:#fcc;"
| 57
| February 14
| @ New Orleans
| 
| Russell Westbrook (44)
| Russell Westbrook (14)
| Russell Westbrook (11)
| Smoothie King Center15,686
| 37–20
|- align="center"
|colspan="9" bgcolor="#bbcaff"|All-Star Break
|- style="background:#cfc;"
| 58
| February 22
| Utah
| 
| Paul George (45)
| Russell Westbrook (15)
| Russell Westbrook (8)
| Chesapeake Energy Arena18,203
| 38–20
|- style="background:#fcc;"
| 59
| February 23
| Sacramento
| 
| Russell Westbrook (41)
| Paul George (13)
| Paul George (5)
| Chesapeake Energy Arena18,203
| 38–21
|- style="background:#fcc;"
| 60
| February 26
| @ Denver
| 
| Paul George (25)
| Russell Westbrook (14)
| Russell Westbrook (9)
| Pepsi Center18,378
| 38–22
|- style="background:#fcc;"
| 61
| February 28
| Philadelphia
| 
| Grant, Westbrook (23)
| Steven Adams (14)
| Russell Westbrook (11)
| Chesapeake Energy Arena18,203
| 38–23

|- style="background:#fcc;"
| 62
| March 2
| @ San Antonio
| 
| Russell Westbrook (19)
| Steven Adams (13)
| Russell Westbrook (8)
| AT&T Center  18,439
| 38–24
|- style="background:#cfc;"
| 63
| March 3
| Memphis
| 
| Russell Westbrook (22)
| Steven Adams (26)
| Dennis Schroder (6)
| Chesapeake Energy Arena18,203
| 39–24
|- style="background:#fcc;"
| 64
| March 5
| @ Minnesota
| 
| Paul George (25)
| Russell Westbrook (13)
| Russell Westbrook (6)
| Target Center15,728
| 39–25
|- style="background:#cfc;"
| 65
| March 7
| @ Portland
| 
| Russell Westbrook (37)
| Paul George (14)
| Paul George (6)
| Moda Center20,037
| 40–25
|- style="background:#fcc;"
| 66
| March 8
| @ LA Clippers
| 
| Russell Westbrook (32)
| Steven Adams (10)
| Russell Westbrook (7)
| Staples Center17,915
| 40–26
|- style="background:#cfc;"
| 67
| March 11
| @ Utah
| 
| Dennis Schroder (24)
| George, Westbrook (11)
| Russell Westbrook (8)
| Vivint Smart Home Arena  18,306
| 41–26
|- style="background:#cfc;"
| 68
| March 13
| Brooklyn
| 
| Russell Westbrook (31)
| Russell Westbrook (12)
| Russell Westbrook (11)
| Chesapeake Energy Arena18,203
| 42–26
|- style="background:#fcc;"
| 69
| March 14
| @ Indiana
| 
| Paul George (36)
| Russell Westbrook (14)
| Russell Westbrook (11)
| Bankers Life Fieldhouse16,656
| 42–27
|- style="background:#fcc;"
| 70
| March 16
| Golden State
| 
| Paul George (29)
| Paul George (13)
| Russell Westbrook (9)
| Chesapeake Energy Arena18,203
| 42–28
|- style="background:#fcc;"
| 71
| March 18
| Miami
| 
| Paul George (31)
| Steven Adams (12)
| Dennis Schroder (6)
| Chesapeake Energy Arena18,203
| 42–29
|- style="background:#fcc;"
| 72
| March 20
| Toronto
| 
| Russell Westbrook (42)
| Jerami Grant (14)
| Russell Westbrook (6)
| Chesapeake Energy Arena18,203
| 42–30
|- style="background:#cfc;"
| 73
| March 22
| @ Toronto
| 
| Paul George (28)
| Russell Westbrook (12)
| Russell Westbrook (13)
| Scotiabank Arena20,014
| 43–30
|- style="background:#fcc;"
| 74
| March 25
| @ Memphis
| 
| Paul George (30)
| Paul George (12)
| Russell Westbrook (7)
|FedExForum15,144
| 43–31
|- style="background:#cfc;"
| 75
| March 27
| Indiana
| 
| Steven Adams (25)
| Steven Adams (12)
| Russell Westbrook (12)
| Chesapeake Energy Arena18,203
| 44–31
|- style="background:#fcc;"
| 76
| March 29
| Denver
| 
| Russell Westbrook (27)
| George, Westbrook (9)
| Russell Westbrook (9)
| Chesapeake Energy Arena18,203
| 44–32
|- style="background:#fcc;"
| 77
| March 31
| Dallas
| 
| Paul George (27)
| Steven Adams (15)
| Russell Westbrook (11)
| Chesapeake Energy Arena18,203
| 44–33

|- style="background:#cfc;"
| 78
| April 2
| LA Lakers
| 
| Jerami Grant (22)
| Russell Westbrook (20)
| Russell Westbrook (20)
| Chesapeake Energy Arena18,203
| 45–33
|- style="background:#cfc;"
| 79
| April 5
| Detroit
| 
| Paul George (30)
| Steven Adams (14)
| Russell Westbrook (15)
| Chesapeake Energy Arena18,203
| 46–33
|- style="background:#cfc;"
| 80
| April 7
| @ Minnesota
| 
| George, Westbrook (27)
| Russell Westbrook (10)
| Russell Westbrook (15)
| Target Center18,978
| 47–33
|- style="background:#cfc;"
| 81
| April 9
| Houston
| 
| Russell Westbrook (29)
| Steven Adams (13)
| Russell Westbrook (10)
| Chesapeake Energy Arena18,203
| 48–33
|- style="background:#cfc;"
| 82
| April 10
| @ Milwaukee
| 
| Dennis Schroder (32)
| Russell Westbrook (11)
| Russell Westbrook (17)
| Fiserv Forum18,082
| 49–33

Playoffs

|- style="background:#fcc;"
| 1
| April 14
| @ Portland
| 
| Paul George (26)
| George, Westbrook (10)
| Russell Westbrook (10)
| Moda Center19,886
| 0–1
|- style="background:#fcc;"
| 2
| April 16
| @ Portland
| 
| Paul George (27)
| Adams, Westbrook (9)
| Russell Westbrook (11)
| Moda Center20,041
| 0–2
|- style="background:#cfc;"
| 3
| April 19
| Portland
| 
| Russell Westbrook (33)
| Steven Adams (7)
| Russell Westbrook (11)
| Chesapeake Energy Arena  18,203
| 1–2
|- style="background:#fcc;"
| 4
| April 21
| Portland
| 
| Paul George (32)
| Paul George (10)
| Russell Westbrook (7)
| Chesapeake Energy Arena 18,203
| 1–3
|- style="background:#fcc;"
| 5
| April 23
| @ Portland
| 
| Paul George (36)
| Russell Westbrook (11)
| Russell Westbrook (14)
| Moda Center  20,241
| 1–4

Player statistics

Regular season

 Led team in statistic
After all games.
‡ Waived during the season
† Traded during the season
≠ Acquired during the season

Playoffs

 Led team in statistic
After all games.

Individual game highs

Transactions

Overview

Trades

Free agency

Re-signed

Additions

Subtractions

Awards, records and milestones

Awards

References

2018-19
2018–19 NBA season by team
2018 in sports in Oklahoma
2019 in sports in Oklahoma